El Mosquito was an independent weekly satire newspaper published in Buenos Aires, Argentina. It was the first political humor newspaper in Argentina.

Overview
After the fall of the Juan Manuel de Rosas regime, there was increased press freedom and many newspapers were started. El Mosquito was one of them and it was established in 1863. It was published every Sunday. It did become daily in April 1968 but it did not succeed. The newspaper was known for its cartoons, caricature and political humour. Later on Henri Stein became its owner and chief cartoonist. Then President of Argentina Domingo Faustino Sarmiento had his cartoons drawn by Henri Stein published in El Mosquito.

Gallery

References

Defunct newspapers published in Argentina
Defunct weekly newspapers
Mass media in Buenos Aires
Weekly newspapers published in Argentina
Publications established in 1863
Publications disestablished in 1893
Spanish-language newspapers
Satirical newspapers
Argentine political satire